This is a list of law schools in Poland.

Public

Gdańsk University, Faculty of Law and Administration
Adam Mickiewicz University in Poznań, Faculty of Law and Administration
Jagiellonian University in Krakow, Faculty of Law and Administration
Cardinal Stefan Wyszynski University in Warsaw, Faculty of Law
University of Łódź, Faculty of Law and Administration
Maria Curie-Skłodowska University in Lublin, Faculty of Law and Administration
Nicolaus Copernicus University in Toruń, Faculty of Law and Administration
University of Opole, Faculty of Law and Administration
University of Rzeszów, Faculty of Law and Administration
University of Szczecin, Faculty of Law and Administration
University of Silesia in Katowice, Faculty of Law and Administration
Białystok University, Faculty of Law
University of Warmia and Mazury in Olsztyn, Faculty of Law and Administration
University of Warsaw, Faculty of Law and Administration
University of Wrocław, Faculty of Law, Administration and Economy

Non-public
Catholic University of Lublin 
Faculty of Law, Canon Law, and Administration
Faculty of Legal and Economic Sciences in Tomaszów Lubelski 
Faculty of Social Sciences in Stalowa Wola
European School of Law and Administration in Warsaw, Faculty of Law, Administration, International Relations
Andrzej Frycz Modrzewski Cracow College, Faculty of Law and Administration
Private Higher School of Business and Administration in Warsaw, Faculty of Administration, Law, and Diplomacy
Ryszard Lazarski University of Commerce and Law in Warsaw, Faculty of Law
 SWPS University of Social Sciences and Humanities, Faculty of Law
Warsaw Management Academy of the Society of Economic Enterprises, Faculty of Law, Administration, and European Integration
Academy of International Economic and Political Relations in Gdynia, Faculty of Law
Leon Koźmiński Academy of Entrepreneurship and Management in Warsaw, Faculty of Law
Higher School of Management and Law in Warsaw, Faculty of Law (Warsaw and Wrocław)
Legnica University of Management, Faculty of Law

Poland
Universities and colleges in Poland
Law faculties
Law schools in Poland